Annette M. Eddie-Callagain (born February 11, 1953) is the first African American attorney to practice law in Japan. She is a practitioner of international family law, notable for child support and child custody cases involving American servicemen and Japanese women.

She was in the United States Air Force and served in the Judge Advocate Generals' Corps on active duty from 1983 to 95 and the reserves from 1995 to 06, when she retired as a major. While in the air force reserves, she opened her private practice in Okinawa, Japan. In the United States, there is a system for compulsory child support payments, but mothers and children in Japan were in a state of crying and falling asleep. In 1997, he began contacting child support enforcement agencies in each state, became a member of the National Child Support Enforcement Association (NCSEA), and coordinated the method of claiming the system from Okinawa was performed. Until around 2005, it was said that the request for child support was free. In 2007, she was inducted into the Southern University Law Center Hall of Fame. As of 2020, she is a part-time lecturer at the Ryukyu University Law School.

References

External links
Trial of US soldier accused on rape continues
US Soldier appears in court
Being A Lawyer in Japan (Black in Japan) | MFiles

1953 births
Living people
Louisiana lawyers
People from New Iberia, Louisiana
United States Air Force Judge Advocate General's Corps
Southern University Law Center alumni
Southern University alumni
Female officers of the United States Air Force
United States Air Force reservists
21st-century American women